2018 Korea Open may refer to:
2018 Korea Open (badminton)
2018 Korea Open (table tennis)
2018 Korea Open (tennis)

See also
Korea Open (disambiguation)